Deen The Best Forever Complete Singles+ is the sixth greatest hits album by Japanese pop rock band Deen. It released on 28 February 2018 under Epic Records Japan label.

Background

The album is released as promotion for their 25th year of band debut anniversary.

Album includes complete all 46 singles by chronological releases, since their debut single "Kono Mama Kimi dake wo Ubaisaritai" until their latest single "Kimi he no Parade", which will be divided in 4 CDS.

Some singles are included for the first time on the album, such as "Kioku no Kage" and its coupling song "Asobi ni Ikou", which were previously released in 2016.

Single versions of "Zenkai Koigokoro", "Zutto Tsutaetakatta I Love You", "Boku ga Kimi wo Wasurenaiyouni" and "Kimi he no Parade" were included in album format for the first time.

Ikemori's solo single "Another Life" will be included in Deen's album for the first time since 2001 release.

The album will include new premium track, "Journey" which is written and produced by all three members together.

First press release will include 5th additional CD "Premium Disc" with eleven original songs by artist which composed and written for Deen, included Miho Komatsu, Seiichiro Kuribayashi, Tetsuro Oda, Wands and Zard. All of these songs were previously released in their compilation album "Deen The Best Kiseki" (with exception of Zard).

Fanclub members will exclusively receive special original album CD with title "Deen the Last" with twelve completely new and unreleased tracks, along with special features including history book and limited package format.

A special website "Deen Chronicle" was launched on 12 January with short commentary on each single.

It is the last album when guitarist and composer, Tagawa was involved with album production before band's withdrawal.

Track listing

Disc 1: 1993-1997

Disc 2: 1998-2003

Disc 3: 2003-2009

Disc 4: 2010-2018

Premium Disk

In media
Kono Mama Kimi Dake wo Ubaisaritai was used as a commercial song for NTT DoCoMo's "Pocket Bell"
Tsubasa wo Hirogete was used as an image song for Nihon TV program J League Chuukei
Eien wo Azuketekure was used as a commercial song for NTT DoCoMo's "Pocket Bell"
Hitomi Sorasanaide was used as a commercial song for Pokari Sweat
Mirai no Tameni was used as an image song for Nihon TV's baseball program
Love Forever was used as an ending theme for Tokyo Broadcasting System Television program Super Soccer
Shounen was used as a theme song for TBS Television program Shounen Jidai
Hitori ja nai was used as an ending theme for Anime television series Dragon Ball
SUNSHINE ON SUMMER TIME was used as a commercial song of Kirin's "Ice Beer"
Egao de Waratteitai was used as theme song for TV Asahi television series Shounibyou to Ichi no Kisetsu
Kimi ga Inai Natsu was used as an ending theme for Anime television series Detective Conan
Yume de Aru You ni was used as an opening theme for PlayStation 2 game Tales of Destiny
Kimi Sae Ireba was used as an opening theme for Anime television series Chūka Ichiban!
Tegotae no nai Ai was used as a theme song for TBS Television program Kinniku Banzuke
Tooi Tooi Mirai he was used as a theme song for TBS Television program Kinniku Banzuke
Just One was used as a commercial song for Sharp Color Fax's "Saiyuki"
My Love was used as a theme song for Fuji TV television series Kaze no Yukue
Christmas Time was used as theme song for TBS Television program Wonderful
Power of Love was used as an ending theme song for Nihon TV program Sport Max
Akizakura -more & more- was used as a theme song for TBS Television program Wonderful
Kanashimi no Mukougawa was used as a theme song for Fuji TV television series Koufuku no Ashita
Birth eve -Dare yori hayai mo Ai no Uta- was used as a theme song for TBS Television program Chu-bo desu yo!
Taiyou to Hanabira was used as a theme song for Nihon TV program Shiodome Style
Utopia ni Mieterunoni was used as an ending theme for TV Asahi Beat Takeshi no TV tackle
Strong Soul was used as an image song for 35th anniversary of "Tokyo Verdy 1969"
Ai no Kagami ga Sekai ni Hibikimasuyouni was used as an ending theme for TBS Television program Tamashii no One Spoon
Starting Over was used as an ending theme for Nihon TV's program Itadaki Muscle
Diamond was used as an official image song for "Chiba Lotte Marines"
Yume no Tsubomi was used as an ending theme for TV Asahi Beat Takeshi no TV tackle
Smile Blue was used as a theme song for NTV (Japan) program NNN News Real Time in "entertainment sport" corner
Eien no Ashita was used as a theme song for Nintendo DS game Tales of Hearts
Celebrate was used as an ending theme song for TBS Television program Megami Search in months of April–May 2008
Brand New Wing was used as a power-play song for Nihon TV's program Happy Music
Mou Nakanaide was used as a theme song for TV Asahi's television series Kasouken no Onna

References

2018 greatest hits albums
Deen (band) albums
Japanese-language compilation albums